Mansoura is a town in Tunisia situated 8 kilometres from Souassi and el Djem.

Populated places in Tunisia